The 2008–09 Xavier Musketeers men's basketball team represented Xavier University in the 2008–09 college basketball season. They were led by head coach Sean Miller in his fifth and final season at Xavier. The Musketeers were members of the Atlantic 10 Conference and played their home games at the Cintas Center. Xavier finished the season with a record of 27–8, 12–4 in A-10 play to win the regular season championship. The Musketeers lost in the quarterfinals of the A-10 tournament to Saint Louis. They received an at-large bid to the NCAA tournament as a #4 seed. The Musketeers defeated Portland State and Wisconsin to advance to the Sweet Sixteen before losing to Pittsburgh.

Previous season 
The Musketeers finished the 2007–08 season with a record of 30–7, 14–2 in conference play to win the regular season championship. Xavier lost to Saint Joseph's in the semifinals of the A-10 tournament. The Musketeers received an at-large bid as a #3 seed to the NCAA tournament where they advanced to the Elite Eight before losing to UCLA.

Roster

Schedule and results 

|-
!colspan=9 style="background:#062252; color:#FFFFFF;"| Regular season

|-
!colspan=9 style="background:#062252; color:#FFFFFF;"| A-10 tournament

|-
!colspan=9 style="background:#062252; color:#FFFFFF;"|NCAA tournament

Rankings

References

Xavier
Xavier Musketeers men's basketball seasons
Xavier